Nikolaos P. Xionis is Professor of Systematic Theology in the Faculty of Theology of the National and Kapodistrian University of Athens. Born in Volos, he studied theology at the Aristotle University of Thessalonica. He pursued postgraduate studies at the Jesuit Sankt Georgen Graduate School of Philosophy and Theology at Frankfurt and at the Centre for Eastern Christian Studies in Ratisbon (Ostkirchliches Institut, Regensburg).

Amongst his published works are:
 Ουσία και ενέργεια του Θεού κατά τον Άγιο Γρηγόριο Νύσσης Ousia kai energeia tou Theou kata ton Gregorio Nusses (A study of essence and energy of God in Gregory of Nyssa),  Athens, 1999.
Die Erkenntnis Gottes nach Walter Kasper, in Θεολογία (2001), ΟΒ´(1), pp. 167-282.
Θεολογικά και φιλοσοφικά στοιχεία στην σκέψη του Μπλεζ Πασκάλ και στον Υπαρξισμό(Blaise Pascal and Existentialism), Αθήνα, 2001.
Προλεγόμενα Θεολογικής Ανθρωπολογίας. Προχριστιανική, ετερόδοξη και ορθόδοξη θεώρηση του ανθρώπου ως προσώπου, Εκδόσεις Γρηγόρη, Αθήνα, 2007.
Contribution to: Markus Mühling (ed.) Gezwungene Freiheit? Personale Freiheit in pluralistischen Europa, Vandenhoeck & Ruprecht, Göttingen, 2009.

Notes

Living people
Year of birth missing (living people)
Greek theologians
Academic staff of the National and Kapodistrian University of Athens
People from Volos